Audrius Nakas (born 1967) is a Lithuanian politician and a former member of the Seimas. He graduated from the Lithuanian Academy of Music and Theatre and worked as an actor before a career in politics.

Nakas was sworn into the parliament on 14 April 2015, after MP Algirdas Vaclovas Patackas had died.

References 

Lithuanian male actors
Politicians from Kaunas
Members of the Seimas
1967 births
Living people
Lithuanian actor-politicians
Date of birth missing (living people)
21st-century Lithuanian politicians
Actors from Kaunas